The 2018 Texas Longhorns football team, known variously as "Texas", "UT", the "Longhorns", or the "Horns”, represented the University of Texas at Austin during the 2018 NCAA Division I FBS football season. The Longhorns played their home games at Darrell K Royal–Texas Memorial Stadium in Austin, Texas, and competed as members of the Big 12 Conference. They were led by second-year head coach Tom Herman.

Texas, coming off a 7–6 season in Herman's first year, began the year ranked 23rd in the preseason AP Poll. In the first game of the year, the Longhorns were upset by Maryland in a game played at FedExField in Landover, Maryland. The team won its next six games, including a dramatic win over No. 7 Oklahoma in the 113th Red River Showdown. The Longhorns rose to as high as No. 6 in the AP Poll, but fell in consecutive weeks to Oklahoma State and West Virginia. At the end of the regular season, Texas had a record of 7–2 in Big 12 play, good for second in the standings and earning them a spot in the Big 12 Championship Game against Oklahoma. The Sooners won the rematch by a score of 39–27. Texas was invited to the Sugar Bowl to play SEC runner-up No. 5 Georgia, which Texas won in an upset by a score of 28–21. They finished with an overall record of 10–4 and were ranked 9th in the final AP Poll, the most wins and highest ranked finish for the school since 2009.

The team was led on offense by sophomore quarterback Sam Ehlinger, who finished with 3,292 passing yards, 25 passing touchdowns, and a Big 12-leading 16 rushing touchdowns. His 41 total touchdowns was third in the conference and seventh nationally. Wide receiver Lil'Jordan Humphrey led the team with 1,176 receiving yards. On defense, the team had three first-team all-conference members in defensive lineman Charles Omenihu and defensive backs Kris Boyd and Caden Sterns.

Previous season
The Longhorns finished the 2017 season 7–6, 5–4 in Big 12 play to finish in four-way tie for fourth place. They were invited to the Texas Bowl where they defeated Missouri.

Preseason

Award watch lists
Listed in the order that they were released

Big 12 media poll
The Big 12 media poll was released on July 12, 2018 with the Longhorns predicted to finish in fourth place.

Schedule

Source
At the time, largest attendance recorded at Darrell K. Royal–Texas Memorial Stadium

Personnel

Roster

Game summaries

vs Maryland

Tulsa

USC

900th Program Win

TCU

at Kansas State

Texas lost their first game on the road at Maryland and then won their next three games at home, and their last two victories came against ranked teams—No. 22 Southern California and No. 17 TCU.  But the travel games (especially in this series) have not been in the Longhorn's favor.  The home team has won last six games between the two teams and Texas has not won in Manhattan since 2002.

Texas was the only team to score in the first half of play, with two touchdowns, a field goal, and a safety.  Kansas State had a chance to score a touchdown on the final play of the first half when Alex Delton threw a pass to Adam Harter that was dropped in the end zone.  The score at the half was Texas 19, Kansas State 0.

Kansas State fared better in the second half, holding Texas scoreless and replacing Alex Delton with Skylar Thompson.  Thompson led Kansas State to score two touchdowns in the second half with 14 points.  In the end, Texas held the lead with a final score of 19-14.  For the next week Texas plays Oklahoma after stopping the second-half comeback by Kansas State.

vs Oklahoma

The 2018 edition of this classic rivalry matchup was pivotal for both the Longhorns and the Sooners, as both had something to prove; OU was playing its first ranked opponent of the season, and Texas was trying to show that it could once again compete with the elite of the NCAA after years of very average performances. This year's game, which ended in a Longhorn victory, was the highest-scoring Red River Showdown game in history, with a combined score of 93. A memorable aspect of this game was Texas' dominance until midway through the fourth quarter, only to eventually surrender a 21-point lead to the Sooners late in the game; Heisman candidate Kyler Murray put on an incredible performance, showcasing his superior speed and accuracy. This comeback, however, did not come to fruition, as Texas kicker Cameron Dicker made a 40-yard field goal with approximately 9 seconds remaining on the clock to win the game for Texas.

Baylor

at Oklahoma State

West Virginia

at Texas Tech

Iowa State

at Kansas

vs Oklahoma (2018 Big 12 Championship)

vs Georgia (2019 Sugar Bowl)

Rankings

Players drafted into the NFL

References

Texas
Texas Longhorns football seasons
Sugar Bowl champion seasons
Texas Longhorns football